Trice Jeraine Harvey (July 14, 1936 – January 31, 2017) was an American politician in the state of California.

Born in Paragould, Arkansas, Trice graduated from Taft Union High School in Taft, California. He served on the Kern County, California Board of Supervisors from 1977 to 1987 and on the Rosedale School Board from 1972 to 1976. Trice also served as an inspector for the Kern County Board of Health. He served in the California State Assembly from 1986 to 1996. Harvey died as a result of a fall.

References

1936 births
2017 deaths
Politicians from Bakersfield, California
People from Paragould, Arkansas
School board members in California
County supervisors in California
Republican Party members of the California State Assembly
Accidental deaths from falls
Accidental deaths in California
20th-century American politicians